Old Italic may refer to:
 Old Italic alphabet
 Old Italic (Unicode block)
 Ancient Italic peoples
 Early (pre-Roman) Italic languages
 Vetus Latina, the "Old Latin" translation of the Christian Bible, occasionally referred to as "Old Italic"